Lugovaya is a rural locality (a village) in Ust-Kachkinskoye Rural Settlement, Permsky District, Perm Krai, Russia. The population was 140 as of 2010. There are 29 streets.

Geography 
It is located 9.5 km south-west from Ust-Kachka.

References 

Rural localities in Permsky District